Charles N'Tchoréré (16 November 1896 – 7 June 1940) was a Gabonese French military officer who was shot by Germans in World War II.

Early life 
Charles N'Tchoréré was born on 16 November 1896 in Libreville, French Gabon. The second of four children in a Mpongwe family, his father worked as an agent for a German commercial firm in German Kamerun. His parents arranged for him to be educated at the Catholic École Montfort. He performed well as a student and while he was there befriended several persons who would later become politicians, including Léon M'ba, Louis Bigmann, and Laurent Antchouey. He completed his studies in 1912. Upon the death of his mother, N'Tchoréré went to Doula to work with his father and older brother. While there he refined his English, which was used as a lingua franc in the colony. In April 1914 he, at the urging of his father, returned to Libreville.

Military career 
World War I broke out in 1914, leading to clashed between French and German forces at the Gabon–Kamerun border. On 19 January 1916 N'Tchoréré, despite being slightly underage, enlisted in the Tirailleurs Sénégalais. He underwent training at the Bakara military camp from then until 28 May, when he was made a secretary for a French officer in Libreville. He was promoted to the rank of sergeant the following year.

Unlike other Gabonese, N'Tchoréré remained in the military after the end of the war. Following brief service in the Rif War in Morocco, he began training at the military school in Fréjus, southern France. In 1924 he was awarded the rank of major, thus becoming one of the first Gabonese to receive a French military commission. He subsequently served under General Maurice Gamelin in defeating an uprising in the French Mandate for Syria and the Lebanon and occupying Damascus.

Following the outbreak of World War II, N'Tchoréré, spent several months in late 1939 training West African troops for combat in Europe. The following year he took command of the 53rd Regiment d'Infantrie Coloniale Mixte Sénégalais. His unit fought Germans on the Somme River. After three days of resistance, the company was left with only ten Africans and five Europeans, and they surrendered near Amiens. The German commander refused to treat N'Tchoréré as an officer. When he refused to fall in line with the black enlisted soldiers, N'Tchoréré was shot. According to Richardot, the perpetrators were from 25th Infantry Regiment (according to Richardot, the 25th Infantry Regiment was from the 7th Panzer Division under command of Erwin Rommel but Scheck reports that Rommel's division had advanced much farther from the area. N'Tchoréré's eldest son, Jean-Baptiste, was killed in action on the lower Somme later that month.

France posthumously honored  N'Tchoréré by naturalising him as a citizen in 1940. A memorial dedicated to N'Tchoréré was established in Airaines, while a statue of him was erected outside the French embassy in Libreville. In 1962 Gabon featured him on a commemorative postage stamp.

References

Works cited 
 
 
 David Gardinier, Historical Dictionary of Gabon 2nd ed. (The Scarecrow Press, 1994) pp. 242–243
 Louis Bigmann, Le Capitaine Charles N'Tchoréré (Abidjan: NEA, 1983)

People from Libreville
People of French Equatorial Africa
1896 births
1940 deaths
French Army personnel of World War II
French military personnel killed in World War II
French military personnel of World War I
People of the Rif War
French Army officers
People executed by Nazi Germany by firearm
French people executed by Nazi Germany